The list of active ships of the Argentine Navy includes ships currently in commission with the Navy, or operated by the Navy on behalf of other organizations.

As of 2017, there were 41 commissioned ships in the navy, including 4 destroyers, 2 amphibious support ships and 2 submarines (though both boats were non-operational as of 2022). The total displacement of the fleet (including auxiliaries) was approximately 128,461 tonnes. The draft 2023 budget submitted to Congress envisages 60 days of navigation for technical and tactical naval training. These are 19 fewer days than in 2022. In contrast, in 2012 the naval force was allocated 358 sailing days.

Warships

Submarines

Note: As of 2023, the entire submarine fleet is inactive.

Destroyers
Note: Argentina uses the classification destructores (destroyers) for the Almirante Brown class, despite them being analogous to medium frigates by most international classifications.

Corvettes

Patrol vessels

Amphibious support ships

Auxiliary vessels

See also

List of auxiliary ships of the Argentine Navy
List of ships of the Argentine Navy
Lists of currently active military equipment by country

Notes

References

Notes

Bibliography

Further reading

External links 
 

Naval ships of Argentina

Lists of ships of Argentina